The Freedom and Equality Party (ÖZEP) was a short-lived pro-Kurdish rights party in Turkey. The party was created in June 1992 before the People's Labor Party (HEP) was banned in July 1993 by the 18 deputies of the HEP. ÖZEP later joined HEP again.

See also
Racism in Turkey
Kurds in Turkey
Human rights of Kurdish people in Turkey

References

1992 establishments in Turkey
1993 disestablishments in Turkey
Banned Kurdish parties in Turkey
Defunct Kurdish parties in Turkey
Defunct social democratic parties in Turkey
Kurdish nationalist political parties
Political parties disestablished in 1993
Political parties established in 1992
Regionalist parties